Throughout naval history during times of war battles, blockades, and other patrol missions would often result in the capture of enemy ships or those of a neutral country. If a ship proved to be a valuable prize efforts would sometimes be made to capture the vessel while inflicting the least amount of damage as was practically possible. Both military and merchant ships were captured, often renamed, and then used in the service of the capturing country's navy, or in many cases sold to private individuals who would break them up for salvage, or use them as merchant vessels, whaling ships, slave ships, or the like. As an incentive to search far and wide for enemy ships, the proceeds of the sale of the vessels and their cargoes were divided up as prize money among the officers and crew of capturing crew members with the distribution governed by regulations the captor vessel's government had established. Throughout the 1800s war prize laws were established to help opposing countries settle claims amicably. Private ships were also authorized by various countries at war through a Letter of marque, legally allowing a ship and commander to engage and capture vessels belonging to enemy countries. In these cases contracts between the owners of the vessels on the one hand, and the captains and the crews on the other, established the distribution of the proceeds from captures.

Legend
 Dates of capture are listed chronologically and appear in bold 
 Names of commanders are those in command when ships were captured.
  The symbol ' ' following a commander's name denotes he was killed in action.
 Name of ship and flag of country listed are those in use at time of ship's capture and will sometimes link to a page with name and flag used after capture.
This list does not include ships captured by pirates.

1800–1809

Quasi-War 

The Quasi-War was an undeclared war fought mostly at sea between the United States and French Republic from 1798 to 1800. France, plagued by massive crop failures and desperately in need of grain and other supplies, commissioned numerous French privateers who both legally and illegally captured cargo from merchant vessels of every flag engaged in foreign trade with Britain. Approximately 300 American ships were captured by the French Navy and privateers under a Letter of marque issued by the government of France. International law mandated that a ship captured during wartime by a belligerent was lost to the owner, and that no compensation was to be made by the country who seized a vessel unless provided for by a treaty that ended that war.

 Deux Anges |  | 27 January 1800A 20-gun French corvette Letter of marque captured by USS Boston commanded by George Little serving in the squadron of Silas Talbot. Deux Anges (sometimes Two Angels in contemporary American accounts) was sent to Boston under Lieutenant Robert Haswell to be condemned by a prize court.
 Mercator |  | May 1800A Danish schooner captured by USS Experiment commanded by Lieutenant Maley entering the Haitian port of Jacmel during the Quasi-War. Maley suspected it to be a French vessel and ordered it to Cape Francois where it was recaptured by the British.
 Godfrey |  | 31 May 1800English registered schooner commanded by H. Atkinson, captured by a French privateer and recaptured by American sloop of war USS Merrimack.
 Flambeau |  | 23 July 1800A French Letter of marque of 12 guns, captured by USS Enterprise, commanded by Captain John Shaw.
 Berceau |  | 12 October 1800A 24-gun French corvette commanded by Capitain de frégate Senez, captured by USS Boston, commanded by Capt. George Little, unbeknown that the Quasi-War had ended several days earlier. She was towed to the United States, repaired and returned to France September 1801.
 Good Friends |  | September 1809An American ship out of Baltimore, commanded by Captain Robert Thompson, captured by the Danes.
 Helvetius |  | September 1809An American ship out of Baltimore, commanded by Captain Ezra Bowen, captured by the Danes.

First Barbary War 

The First Barbary War (1801–5), was the first of the First Barbary War and the Second Barbary War fought between the United States and the North African Berber Muslim states known collectively as the Barbary States. For years the Barbary Corsairs had harassed and captured British, French and American shipping, often capturing vessels seizing cargoes and holding crews for large ransoms or enslaving them. Refusing to pay tribute President Thomas Jefferson sent a fleet of ships to the Mediterranean shores of North Africa to deal with the constant threats to U.S. and other ships.
 Meshboha |  | 26 August 1803A brig cruiser belonging to the Emperor of Morocco.
  | | 31 October 1803 | ( Ottoman Tripolitania Navy) | 16 February 1804 A frigate that ran aground in the Mediterranean leaving it at the mercy of the Barbary corsairs of Tripoli. She was recaptured and burned in Tripoli harbor three and a half months later by Lieutenant Stephen Decatur.
 Mastico | ( Ottoman Tripolitania Navy) | 23 December 1803A ketch built in France in 1798 for Napoleon's Egyptian expedition, later sold to Tripoli and renamed Mastico. Captured by USS Enterprise and USS Constitution under the commands of Stephen Decatur and William Bainbridge respectively. Renamed USS Intrepid, was one of several vessels under the command of Stephen Decatur which recaptured and destroyed the  16 February 1804.
 Transfer | ( Ottoman Tripolitania Navy) | 21 March 1804Former British privateer, Transfer out of Malta, later sold to Tripoli and used in blockade running during the Barbary Wars. Captured off Tripoli, by Syren commanded by Lieutenant Charles Stewart. She was renamed the USS Scourge.

French Revolutionary and Napoleonic Wars 

The French Revolutionary Wars and the Napoleonic Wars were a series of wars declared against the French Republic and Napoleon's French Empire by opposing coalitions that ran from 1792 to 1815 involving many often large scale naval battles resulting in the capture of numerous ships. Among the most notable of such battles were the Battle of Trafalgar and the Battle of Copenhagen involving hundreds of ships and many thousands of seamen and officers.
She was renamed HMS Venturer due to Ranger having been reused in her absence. Possibly the most captured warship in history.
  |  | 24 June 1800 A 74-gun ship of the line commanded by Captain Hallowell, captured by the French fleet, commanded by Admiral Ganteaume. She was later recaptured at the Battle of Trafalgar.
Renamed HMS Vengeance.
  |  | 10 February 1801 A 16-gun British sloop and fireship, commanded by Captain Richard Dun, captured by the French Navy at Cape de Gat.
  |  | 10 February 1801A 32-gun fifth-rate frigate launched in 1781, captured by the French and recaptured by the British the same year.
  |  | 10 February 1801Captured by the French Navy.

Battle of Copenhagen 

The Battle of Copenhagen was a naval battle involving a large British fleet under the command of Admiral Sir Hyde Parker, defeating and capturing many of the Danish-Norwegian fleet anchored just off Copenhagen on 2 April 1801. Vice-Admiral Horatio Nelson led the main attack.

 HDMS Holsteen |  | 2 April 1801A 60-gun ship of the line in the Royal Dano-Norwegian Navy.  She was commissioned in 1775, captured at the Battle of Copenhagen.
 HDMS Indfødsretten |  | 2 April 1801Captured, burnt
 HDMS Prøvesteenen |  | 2 April 1801Abandoned, captured, burnt
 HDMS Valkyrien |  | 2 April 1801Abandoned, captured, burnt
 HDMS Rendsborg |  | 2 April 1801Driven ashore, captured, burnt
 HDMS Jylland |  | 2 April 1801Captured and burnt
 HDMS Sværdfisken |  | 2 April 1801captured and burnt
 HDMS Kronborg |  | 2 April 1801Captured and burnt
 HDMS Haien |  | 2 April 1801Captured and burnt
 HDMS Charlotte Amalie |  | 2 April 1801Captured and burnt
 HDMS Søehesten |  | 2 April 1801Captured and burnt
 See also List of Danish sail frigates and List of ships of the line of Denmark

Napoleonic Wars (continued i) 

  |  | 6 July 1801A 74-gun third-rate ship of the line of the British Royal Navy, launched on 15 April 1786, named after Hannibal of Carthage. Ran aground and captured during the first part of the Battle of Algeciras Bay.
   |  (Franco-Spanish fleet) | 6–12 July 1801Captured by British at the Battle of Algeciras Bay.
  | | 1803 captured by the privateer slaver Kitty; became Kitty's Amelia, the last vessel to legally undergo a slave trading voyage (27 July 1807) before the passage of the Slave Trade Act of 1807.
She was restored to the Royal Navy in her old name, the existing Ambuscade being renamed HMS Seine. First captured by the British during the Battle of Tory Island in 1797, recaptured by the corvette  in 1798 to be recaptured by the British again in 1803.
  |  | 25 June 1803A Serpente-class corvette bearing 18 guns.
  |  | 25 June 1803A  bearing 20 guns.
 HMS Minerve |  | 3 July 1803A 40-gun frigate under the command of Captain Jahleel Brenton, (re)captured by the French navy after it ran aground chasing other ships. Originally a French ship, captured by British in 1792.
  |  | 24 July 1803A  74-gun ship of the line, commanded by Commodore Quérangal. Captured by British squadron, commanded by Commodore Loring. Vessel was stranded in 1804, broken up 1805.
  |  | 25 November 1803An 18-gun schooner, captured by the Royal Navy after a chase. Later renamed Crafty, and captured by the Spanish in 1807.
  |  British East India Company | 15 September 1804A 24-gun East Indiaman, captured by the French Navy in the Battle of Vizagapatam.
  |  | 25 November 1804A 42-gun Spanish frigate, captured by the Royal Navy in the action of 25 November 1804 off Cádiz.
  |  | 1805An 80-gun ship of the line, broken up in 1816.
  |  | 18 February 1805A 32-gun Amazon-class fifth-rate frigate of the Royal Navy, commanded by Sir Robert Laurie. Captured by Ville de Milan, commanded by Captain Jean-Marie Renaud.
  |  | 25 September 1805An East Indiaman converted to a 56-gun ship of the line. Captured by 74-gun , later ran aground and recaptured by British and set ablaze 12 April 1809 at the Battle of the Basque Roads.

Battle of Trafalgar 

The Battle of Trafalgar was fought on 21 October 1805 off the Spanish coast near Cape Trafalgar involving the allied fleets of Spain and France against the Royal Navy of Britain. Britain's answer to Napoleon's threat, it proved to be the turning point of the Napoleonic era and is regarded as the last great sea battle of the period. The battle involved dozens of sailing warships and vessels many of which fell to capture while many were also met with what is considered a worse fate in the storm that followed.

  |  | 21 October 1805A  74-gun French ship of the line. Present at the Battle of Trafalgar, commanded by Captain Louis Alexis Baudoin who was killed in the battle, fired the first shot of the battle. After its capture by British it was wrecked in the storm of 23 October that followed the battle and sunk, taking with her all hands on board.
  |  | 21 October 1805A Téméraire-class 74-gun ship of the line.  Commanded by Captain Lucas  Redoutable is known for her fiercely fought duel with  during the Battle of Trafalgar, killing Vice Admiral Horatio Nelson, incurring the highest losses of the battle.  Captured by British, she foundered during the storm the next day and sunk, taking with her all hands.
  |  | 21 October 1805An 80-gun ship of the line of the French Navy, lead ship of her class. It was the flagship of the French fleet at the Battle of Trafalgar, commanded by Captain Jean-Jacques Magendie.
Escaped after capture making her way to Cadiz.
  | | 21 October 1805A 74-gun third-rate ship of the line, captured at the Battle of Trafalgar and scuttled by British.
  |  | 21 October 1805A 74-gun French ship of the line. took part in the Battle of Trafalgar, captured during the battle. On the following day, her crew rose up turned against her captors and recaptured their ship, however, she was wrecked in the storm of 23 October 1805.
  |  | 21 October 1805An 80-gun ship of the line of the French Navy. After engaging the British ,  and  she was finally captured. During the storm of 23 October she broke her anchor chains and was wrecked with only about 150 out of 1200 men aboard surviving.
  |  |  | 21 October 1805The British HMS Berwick, a 74-gun ship of the line, was captured by the French in 1795. She was recaptured by the British at the Battle of Trafalgar. While in tow her captives cut her cables, she struck a shoal and sank with approximately 200 perishing in the storm.
  |  |  | 21 October 1805 A 74-gun ship of the line, originally the British Swiftsure, commanded by Captain Hallowell, captured by the French fleet, commanded by Admiral Ganteaume, on 24 June 1800. Under the command of Captain l'Hôpitalier-Villemadrin she was recaptured at the Battle of Trafalgar and was one of the few captured ships to survive the storm.
  |  | 21 October 1805An 80-gun ship of the line of the Spanish Navy. Present at the Battle of Trafalgar, noted for being the oldest vessel present. Rayo escaped from the battle but was intercepted by  fresh out of Gibraltar and then was wrecked 26 October 1805 in the storm that followed.
   |  | 21 October 1805A 112-gun three-decker ship of the line of the Spanish Navy. Captured by British at Battle of Trafalgar. two days later, a squadron under the command of Commodore Cosmao-Kerjulien recaptured her and took her back to Cadiz.
  |  | 21 October 1805An 80-gun  ship of the line of the Spanish Navy. Captured at the Battle of Trafalgar, later ran aground and set fire by the British.
  |  | 21 October 1805A 74-gun ship of the line. Present at the Battle of Algeciras in 1801 and the Battle of Trafalgar in 1805.
  |  | 21 October 1805A first-rate ship of the line, launched in 1769, bearing 112 guns, increased to 130 guns in 1795–96. Commanded by Francisco Javier Uriarte and Rear Admiral Baltasar Hidalgo de Cisneros, present at Battle of Trafalgar, the largest ship in the allied fleet. Captured by British, wrecked in storm following day.
  |  | 21 October 1805A 74-gun ship of the line, commanded by Captain Don Teodoro de Argumosa, present at Battle of Trafalgar. After its capture it was burnt on 26 October 1805. 
  |  | 21 October 1805A 74 gun ship of the line, commanded by Commodore Dionisio Alcalá Galiano who lost his life from cannon fire.
  |  | 21 October 1805A 74-gun ship of the line launched in 1765, commanded by Commodore Don Cosmé Damián Churruca y Elorza who was killed in action, present at Battle of Trafalgar, with half its crew dead or wounded.
  |  | 21 October 1805A 74-gun ship that saw service in French, British and American waters in the late 18th century. Present at the Battle of Trafalgar, commanded by Captain Don Jose Ramón de Vargas y Varáez; captured by the British  and renamed HMS Ildefonso, it was one of the few captured vessels that survived the storm following the battle.

Napoleonic Wars (continued ii) 

 Duguay-Trouin  |  |  4 November 1805 74-gun Téméraire class. Captured by British, renamed HMS Implacable; training ship 1805, scuttled 1949
 Mont Blanc |  | 4 November 1805A French Ship of the line, 74 guns, she was used by the British at the Battle of Trafalgar after her capture at the Battle of Cape Ortegal. Hulked 1811, sold 1819
 Scipion |  | 4 November 1805A 74 gun ship of the line, present at the Battle of Cape Finisterre, and the Battle of Trafalgar. Captured by the British at the Battle of Cape Ortegal, later broken up 1819.
  |  | 6 February 1806  Viala was a 74-gun  launched in 1795. She was captured by the Royal Navy in 1806 at the Battle of San Domingo.
 Marengo |  | 13 March 1806A Téméraire-class ship of the line bearing 80 guns, commanded by Admiral Charles Linois. See also: Action of 13 March 1806
 Belle Poule |  | 13 March 1806A 40-gun . Captured by HMS Foudroyant bearing 80 guns, commanded by Admiral John B. Warren. See also: Action of 13 March 1806
 Néarque |  | 28 March 1806A French brig, 16 guns, she was captured by the British off France.
 La Bellone |  | 12 July 1806A 34-gun privateer captured off the coast of Ceylon by HMS Rattlesnake and HMS Powerful under the command of Sir Edward Pellew. See also: Action of 9 July 1806
 Armide |  | 25 September 1806A frigate of 40 guns under the command of Commodore Sir Samuel Hood. Was present at Allemand's expedition of 1805, captured by British forces during the action of 25 September 1806 by, HMS Centaur.
 Alceste |  | 25 September 1806A 38-gun  of the French Navy. Captured along with Armide, Gloire and Infatigable by a four-ship squadron under Samuel Hood.
 Alexandre |  | 180680-gun ship of Tonnant class, sold 1822.
 Brave |  | 6 Feb 180674 gun, captured by British, foundered 1806.
 Maida |  |  74 (1795) 6 Feb 1806– ex-French Jupiter, captured by British, sold 1814.
 HMS Crafty |  | 9 March 1807A 14-gun schooner, boarded and captured by three Spanish warship north of Tétouan. Formerly a French warship, captured in 1803.
 HDMS Sarpen |  | 7 September 1807A brig of the Royal Dano-Norwegian Navy, which she served from 1791 to 1807 until the British capture, taking possession under terms of capitulation following the Second Battle of Copenhagen.
 Little Belt | | 7 September 1807Originally a Danish 22-gun warship launched in 1801, captured by the British at the Second Battle of Copenhagen, renamed HMS Little Belt, commanded by Arthur Bingham. Captured second time by USS President, commanded by John Rodgers.
  |  | 1807A whaler, she was first captured by a Spanish privateer, then by a British warship, then by another Spanish privateer. Brought to Algiers, then released.
 Piémontaise |  | 8 March 1808a 40-gun  that served as a commerce raider in the Indian Ocean, commanded by Lieutenant de vaisseau Charles Moreau . Captured by HMS St Fiorenzo of 38 guns, commanded by Captain George Nicholas Hardinge off the coast of India. She was renamed HMS Piedmontaise served in the British Royal Navy, until broken up in 1813.
 Griffon |  | 11 May 180816-gun French Palinure-class brig, captured by HMS Bachante off Cape San Antonio, Cuba.
 HMS Tickler |  | 4 June 1808A 14-gun Archer-class brig built in 1804. Captured by Danish gunboats in the Great Belt. Operated under the same name by the Royal Dano-Norwegian Navy until sold off in 1815.
 HMS Turbulent |  | 9 June 1808A 16-gun  launched in 1805. Captured by Danish gunboats off Saltholm. Operated under the same name by the Royal Dano-Norwegian Navy until sold off in 1814.
 Neptune |  | 14 June 180880-gun French , captured by the Spaniards in Cadiz harbour.
 Héros |  | 14 June 1808 74-gun French Téméraire-class ship of the line, captured by the Spaniards in Cadiz harbour.
 Pluton |  | 14 June 1808 74-gun French ship of the line, captured by the Spaniards in Cadiz harbour.
 Algesiras |  | 14 June 1808 74-gun French Téméraire-class ship of the line, captured by the Spaniards in Cadiz harbour.
 Argonaute |  | 14 June 1808 74-gun French ship of the line, captured by the Spaniards in Cadiz harbour.
 Cornélie |  | 14 June 1808 44-gun French frigate, captured by the Spaniards in Cadiz harbour.
 HMS Seagull |  | 19 June 1808A 16-gun Seagull-class brig built in 1805. Captured by the sloop Lougen off Christiansand. Operated under the same name by the Royal Dano-Norwegian Navy until transferred to the fledgling Royal Norwegian Navy in 1814. Decommissioned in 1817.
 HMS Tigress |  | 2 August 1808A 14-gun Archer-class brig launched in 1804. Captured by Danish gunboats in the Great Belt. Operated under the same name by the Royal Dano-Norwegian Navy until sold off in 1815.
 HMS Carnation |  | 3 October 1808An 18-gun  brig-sloop launched in 1807, commanded by Charles Mars Gregory. Captured by the French brig Palinure, commanded by Captain de frègate Jance. Burnt in 1809 to avoid recapture.
Santo Domingo |  | Captured by the British in 1809.
Taken into British service as HMS Colibri, wrecked on 23 August 1813 in Port Royal Sound.
While commanded by John Shortland she was recaptured on 13 December 1809 by Clorinde and Renommée and renamed HMS Junon.
 D'Hautpoul |  | 17 April 1809A Téméraire-class 74-gun ship of the line., captured by British, renamed HMS Abercrombie, sold 1817.
 Felicite |  | 17 June 1809French 36-gun frigate, 900 tons, Captured by HMS Latona, a 38-gun frigate commanded by Captain Hugh Pigot.
 HMS Alert |  | 10 August 1809An 18-gun brig built in 1807 for the Royal Dano-Norwegian Navy under the name Allart, captured by the British following the Second Battle of Copenhagen. Recaptured by Danish gunboats off Fredriksvern. Operated under the same name by the Royal Dano-Norwegian Navy until transferred to the fledgling Royal Norwegian Navy in 1815. Decommissioned in 1817.
 HMS Minx |  | 2 September 1809A 13-gun Archer-class brig launched in 1801. Captured by Danish gunboats off Skagen. Operated under the same name by the Royal Dano-Norwegian Navy until sold off in 1811.
She was set afire and scuttled the next day.
 Amelia Wilson |  | 1809French merchantman captured by the British Navy in 1809.
See also:
 List of French sail frigates
 List of ships of the line of the Royal Navy
 List of frigate classes of the Royal Navy
 List of early warships of the English navy

1810–1819 

Napoleonic Wars (continued)

 HMS Grinder |  | 13 April 1810A gunboat launched in 1809. Captured by Danish gunboats off Anholt.
 Nereide |  | 23 August 1810A  36-gun, copper-hulled, frigate of the French Navy. Captured by the British at Isle of France at the Battle of Grand Port. 
 HMS Alban |  | 12 September 1810 | 11 May 1811A schooner launched in 1806. Captured by Danish gunboats off Skagen. Operated by the Dano-Norwegian Navy under the same name until recaptured by the British in 1811.
 Corona | |  13 March 1811A 40-gun  frigate of the French Navy. Built her in 1807 for the Venetian Navy Captured by British at the Battle of Lissa.
  | | 16 May 1811A post ship captured by John Rodgers in command of USS President. The engagement came to be known as the Little Belt affair, one of many incidents that led to the War of 1812.
 HMS Safeguard |  | 29 June 1811A 13-gun Archer-class brig launched in 1804. Captured by Danish gunboats off Jutland. Operated under the same name by the Royal Dano-Norwegian Navy until sold off in 1813.
 HMS Manly |  | 2 September 1811A 13-gun Archer-class brig launched in 1804. Captured by Danish brigs Lolland, Alsen and Samsø off Arendal. Operated under the same name by the Royal Dano-Norwegian Navy until sold off in 1813.
 Rivoli |  |  22 Feb 181274-gun Le Pluton class, broken up 1819.
 HMS Attack |  | 19 August 1812A 13-gun Archer-class brig launched in 1804. Captured by Danish gunboats. Operated under the same name by the Royal Dano-Norwegian Navy until sold off in 1813.
  |  | 8 September 1812
 San Antonio |  | 13 October 1812. Captured by the British sloop Merope, commanded by John Charles Gawen.
 Trave |  |  23 October 1813A 40-gun Pallas-class frigate, captured by British, broken up 1821.
 Brillant |  |  181474-gun ship of the line, captured by the British on slip, renamed Genoa, broken up 1838.

War of 1812 
The War of 1812 was fought between Great Britain and the United States whose young navy made a notable stand at sea against the largest and most formidable navy in the world at the time. The causes of the war were regarded differently between the two countries. The U.S. was appalled at Britain for seizing their ships and impressing American citizens into its navy, while Britain maintained that it had the right to search neutral vessels for property or persons of its foes. The ships of the two countries were involved in many engagements along the Atlantic coast, the Great Lakes, the Gulf of Mexico and the West Indies with numerous vessels being destroyed or captured on both sides.
 Alexander (brig) |  | Unknown dateA civilian brig. Taken as a prize by the British
 Lord Nelson | | 5 June 1812 | 24 December 1815A schooner commanded by Robert Percy, captured by USS Oneida, commanded by Commodore M.T. Woolsey, while enforcing the Embargo Law. 
  |  | 8 July 1812A Royal Navy  of 75 tons and 4 guns, launched in 1805, Lieutenant Lewis Maxey. Present at the Battle of Copenhagen, Captured at Hampton Roads by American privateer Dash commanded by Captain Garroway.
  |  | 16 July 1812Built in 1799 as a merchant vessel it was purchased by the U.S. Navy in 1803 and converted into a 16-gun brig. Commanded by Lieutenant W. Crane, it was captured off the coast of New Jersey by a blockading British fleet: Shannon, Belvidera, Africa, Eolus and Guerriere – the last vessel of these itself defeated by USS Constitution only a month later. Taken into possession for use in the Royal Navy and renamed HMS Emulous.
 Ulysses |  | 20 July 1812A British brig bound for Halifax from the West Indies captured by American privateer Paul Jones.
Henry | | 26 July 1812A new merchant ship, captured after a 15-minute fight, carrying sugar and old Madeira wine from St Croix to London by the American privateer , commanded by Captain Thomas Boyle. Valued at $150,000-170,00, sent to Baltimore.
 Hopewell |  | July 1812 The American privateer , commanded by Captain Thomas Boyle, captured the merchant ship Hopewell, of 400 tons, as Hopewell was on her way to London from Surinam, carrying sugar, molasses, cotton, coffee and cocoa by. One of Hopewells men was killed. The ship was sent to Baltimore where the cargo was valued at $150,000,.
John |  | 18 September 1812 A merchant ship, 400 tons, captured on her passage from Demerara to Liverpool by the American privateer , commanded by Captain Thomas Boyle. The prize was valued at $150,000-200,000 and sent to Baltimore. One of over thirty other merchant vessels captured by Boyle.
  |  | 8 October 1812  Caledonia was a brig, formerly HMS Caledonia, captured by the U.S. Navy, during the War of 1812 and taken into American service. Commanded by Lieutenant D. Turner the brig played an important role with the American squadron on Lake Erie; sold at the end of the war.
  |  | 8 October 1812An 18-gun , launched on 9 February 1806, commanded by Thomas Whinyates.
 USS Adams |  | 9 October 1812Adams was in drydock at Detroit for repairs when war broke out, captured by the British and renamed .
 |  /  | 15 October 1812Commanded by Jacob Jones. Wasp was a sailing sloop of war captured by the British in the War of 1812. She was constructed in 1806 at the Washington Navy Yard. Captured twice.
  |  | 18 October 1812A British packet with eighty one boxes of gold and silver aboard, captured by  commanded by Commodore John Rodgers with Matthew C. Perry aboard
  |  | 25 October 1812A 38-gun fifth rate  in the Royal Navy, captured by the  commanded by Stephen Decatur during the War of 1812.
 | | 1 November 1812A British whaler of 10 guns and 26 men, carrying a cargo of oil and whalebone, bound for London was captured by  under the command of Captain John Smith. The ship was ordered to the United States. She was one of the five prizes Smith took during the war.
 HMS Duke of Gloucester or Gloucester |  | 27 April 1813A 10-gun brig launched on Lake Erie in 1807, captured American squadron under the command of Commodore Isaac Chauncey's and taken back to Sackett's Harbor. Destroyed by the British a few weeks later.
  |  | 1 June 1813A frigate, commanded by Captain James Lawrence that was pounded by 362 shots from  before its surrender.See: Capture of USS Chesapeake
  |  | 3 June 1813Part of Thomas Macdonough's fleet overtaken by British while on blockade patrol at the Battle of Lake Champlain. Renamed HMS Finch
  |  | 14 August 1813A brig commanded by William Henry Allen surrendered to British after engagement with HMS Pelican in St George's Channel.See: Capture of USS Argus
See also: Capture of HMS Boxer
  |  | 1813American merchantman launched in 1810, captured by the Royal Navy, in 1813.
  |  | 14 February 1814A 16-gun schooner built as the American privateer Syren and commissioned as Letter of marque, captured by Royal Navy 20 April 1813, renamed Pictou. Commanded by Lieutenant Edward Stephens Pictou was recaptured at Barbados during the War of 1812 by the American frigate  commanded by Charles Stewart. 
  |  | 28 March 1814A sailing frigate commanded by David Porter that served in the Quasi-War, the First Barbary War and the War of 1812.
 HMS Ballahou |  | 29 April 1814A schooner of four guns, commanded by Norfolk King, was the name ship of the Royal Navy's s. Captured by 5-gun American privateer Perry off the coast of South Carolina.
  |  | 28 June 1814An 18-gun , launched in 1804. See also: Sinking of HMS Reindeer
  |  | 12 July 1814A brig, served in First Barbary War and War of 1812. Captured in 1814 by Royal Navy.
  |  | 12 July 1814A 4-gun , commanded by Lieutenant Robert Daniel Lancaster. Captured near Gibraltar by an American privateer Syren, a schooner sporting one heavy long gun, under Captain J.D. Daniels.
  |  | 22 June 1814 A brig under the command of Lt. James Renshaw, was captured by the 50-gun, British frigate .
  (sloop) |  | 11 September 1814A 12-gun sloop and the second US Navy ship to carry the name. Captured by British and renamed Icicle.
  |  | 14 December 1814A sloop lost to the British at the Battle of Lake Borgne.
  |  | 14 December 1814A sloop-of-war lost to the British at the Battle of Lake Borgne.
  (frigate) |  | 15 January 1815A frigate that was named by George Washington, commanded by Stephen Decatur, fell into British hands when encountered by .See: Capture of USS President
  |  | 26 February 1815 This 14-gun schooner was captured just off Havana by the American privateer , commanded by Captain Thomas Boyle, who claimed over thirty prizes as a privateer during the war.
  |  | 23 March 1815  A 19-gun  commanded by James Dickenson; captured by 20-gun sloop-of-war , commanded by James Biddle, following a gunnery duel off the American cruiser base of Tristan da Cunha. Set ablaze after the removal of its stores due to irreparable damage. Final battle of the war between British and American forces.See: Capture of HMS Penguin
See also: :Category:War of 1812 ships of the United Kingdom

Second Barbary War 

 Mashouda |  Ottoman Algeria Navy | 17 June 1815An Algerian frigate and flagship in the Algerian fleet during the Second Barbary War, commanded by Rais Hammida . Captured by USS Guerriere, commanded by Stephen Decatur.
 Estedio |  Ottoman Algeria Navy | 19 June 1815An Algerian brig captured by American fleet under the command of Stephen Decatur.
 Eugene |  | 17 January 1817An armed Mexican schooner attempting to smuggle slaves into the United States.
 General Ramirez |  | 1819 Venezuelan privateer, captured with 280 slaves by United States ship.

Chilean war of independence
The Navy of Chile website lists 26 Spanish prizes during the War of Independence. The most famous are probably:
 Águila (1796) |  | 26 February 1817first naval vessel of the Chilean Navy
 María Isabel (1816) |  | 20 October 1818captured by Manuel Blanco Encalada off Santa María Island, Chile
 Moctezuma |  | 24 March 1819captured by Thomas Cochrane, 10th Earl of Dundonald in El Callao
 Esmeralda (1791) |  | 5 to 6 November 1820captured by Thomas Cochrane, 10th Earl of Dundonald in El Callao
 Las Caldas |  | 24 July 1824captured by Thomas Cochrane, 10th Earl of Dundonald in El Callao. (later renamed Monteagudo)
 Aquiles |  | 23 June 1825Ship handed over to the Chilean authorities
For vessels captured by Chilean Letter of marque ships, see list of prizes

1820–1829 

 La Jeune Eugene |  | 1821
 La Daphnee |  | 1821
 La Mathilde |  | 1821
 L'Elize |  | 1821Above four ships captured together by USS Alligator. All except the La Jeune Eugene escaped while being escorted to Boston. France protests.
 Teresa |  | 9 April 1824A Spanish brig outfitted as a slaver, captured at Monrovia by El Vincendor, commanded by Captain Cottrell.
San Buenaventura |  | 9 January 1827  A Spanish brig captured off Yucatán by Mexican Navy Ship of the line Congreso Mexicano (former Spanish Asia (ship)) with 214 men to Havana.

1830–1839

West Africa Squadron
  |   | 6 April 1830 a British East India packet schooner captured by pirates but retaken by her crew.

War of the Confederation 
  |  Confederation | 4 August 1836Crew handed the ship over to the Chilean government

Texas Revolution 

  |  | 1 September 1835A Mexican Navy warship captured by the merchant ships San Felipe and Laura after a bloody exchange of cannon fire off the coast of Texas known as the San Felipe Incident. On board San Felipe was Stephen F. Austin.
  |  | 3 March 1836A Mexican merchantman captured by Captain W. Brown in the Liberty, later ran aground on a sandbar and was wrecked.
 Independence |  | 17 April 1837Former cutter , captured by the Mexican Navy in the Battle of the Brazos River. In service under Mexican flag as La Independencia.

1839 

  |  | 1839A two-masted schooner built in Spain and owned by a Spaniard living in Cuba. Was used to transport Africans into slavery, who took control of the ship in 1839.
  |  |  | November 1839
  |  |  | November 1839
  |  |  | November 1839
  |  |  | November 1839Above four slaver ships seized together off the coast of Africa using American and Spanish flags to suit the occasion along with fraudulent papers. Captured by British cruiser and brought to United States.
  |  | 23 September 1839Fitted as a slaver, and captured by a British cruiser on the coast of Africa.
  |  | October 1839Captured on the African coast by a British cruiser, and brought by her to New York.
  |  | 1839With American papers, seized by British cruisers as Spanish property. Before this she had been boarded fifteen times.
  |  | September 1839Seized by a British cruiser, and condemned at Sierra Leone.

1840–1849 

 SS Sarah Ann |  | March 1840Captured with fraudulent papers.
 SS Tigris |  | 1840Captured by British cruisers and sent to Boston for kidnapping.
 SS Jones |  | 1840Seized by the British.
 SS Shakespeare |  | 7 November 1842Shakespeare, of Baltimore, with 430 slaves, captured by British cruisers.
 SS Cyrus |  | 1844Cyrus, of New Orleans, suspected slaver, captured by the British cruiser Alert.
 SS Spitfire |  | 14 May 1845Spitfire, of New Orleans, captured on the coast of Africa, under American flag and the captain indicted in Boston.
 SS Casco |  | 1849Slaver, with no papers; searched, and captured with 420 slaves, by a British cruiser.

Mexican–American War 

At the onset of the Mexican–American War on 12 May 1846, Commodore John D. Sloat was in command of the Pacific fleet. The Pacific war against Mexico lasted only eight months with few casualties. The Pacific fleet consisted mainly of ten ships: two ships of the line, two frigates, two sloops-of-war, and four sloops. As the Mexican navy was very small few vessels were ever captured.

 Malek Adhel |  | 21 August 1846Mexican merchant brig captured by sloop of war USS Warren under the command Lieutenant William Radford.
 Alerta |  | 10 November 1847A sloop captured by the chartered Libertad with its crew of eleven in the Gulf of California, about twenty-five miles north of Mulegé.

First Schleswig War 

During the First Schleswig War (18481850) the Royal Danish Navy first supported the Danish Army's advance south against the rebels in Schleswig-Holstein, and later blockaded the German ports.

 Christian der achte |  Private ship | 31 March 1848A civilian steamship, captured by the Danish naval steamer Hekla and the brig St. Thomas at Aabenraa. Used as a transport by the Royal Danish Navy.
 Gefion |  | 5 April 1849A frigate, captured by Prussian forces during the Battle of Eckernförde.
  |  | 1853A gunboat, surrendered to the Royal Danish Navy after the end of the First Schleswig War. Commissioned into Danish service as

1850–1859 

 SS Martha |  |  | 7 June 1850Martha, of New York, captured by USS Perry when about to embark from southern coast of Africa with 1800 slaves. The captain was admitted to bail, and escaped.
 Volusia |  | 2 July 1850A Brazilian brig outfitted as a slaver with a Brazilian crew, carrying false papers under the American flag, captured near Kabinda off the Congo River by British steam-sloop HMS Rattler, commanded by Arthur Cumming.
 SS Lucy Ann |  | 1850Lucy Ann, of Boston, captured with 547 slaves by the British.
 SS Navarre | Country of origin unknown | 1850Slaver, trading to Brazil, boarded, searched and seized by the commander of H. M. steam-sloop HMS Firefly.
 SS Glamorgan |  | 1853Glamorgan, of New York, captured when about to depart with approximately 700 slaves.
 SS Grey Eagle |  | 1854Grey Eagle, of Philadelphia, captured off Cuba by British.
 SS William Clark |  | 1857 Ship from New Orleans, seized after prolonged surveillance by HMS Firefly.
 SS Jupiter |  | 1857 Fitted out at New Orleans, captured by HMS Antelope with 70 slaves aboard.
 SS Eliza Jane |  | 22 August 1857Fitted out at New York, captured by HMS Alecto without papers or colors.
 SS Jos. H. Record |  |  |1857 A schooner from Newport, Rhode Island, captured by HMS Antelope with 191 slaves aboard. Crew members from Spain and USA.
 SS Onward |  | 1857 Slaver vessel out of Boston, suspected of several smuggling attempts under American colors. Captured by HMS Alecto.
 SS Echo |  |  | 21 August 1858The Echo was commanded by Captain Edward Townsend and financed by foreign nationals from Brazil and was captured by USS Dolphin off the northern coast of Cuba near the Santaren Channel with 306 slaves.

1860–1869 

 SS Erie |  | 1860Erie, transporting 897 Africans from African coast, captured by a United States ship.

American Civil War 

During the American Civil War the Union naval blockade at first proved to be ineffective at keeping ships from entering or leaving southern ports but towards the end of the war it played a significant role in its victory over the Confederate states. By the end of the war the Union Navy had captured many Confederate ships, moreover had also captured more than 1,100 blockade runners while destroying or running aground another 355 vessels. Using specially designed blockade runners, private business interests from Europe also supplied the Confederate Army. The Confederacy came into the war with no Navy to speak of but in little time were producing the now famous ironclad vessels in response to the Union blockade, however these were being destroyed or captured as fast as they were being produced and ultimately did little to alleviate the strangle hold the Union blockade had on the Confederacy.

 USMS Nashville |  | 13 April 1861 A brig-rigged, side-paddle-wheel passenger steamer originally built as a United States Mail Service ship. Captured 13 April 1861 at Charleston harbor after the fall of Fort Sumter and renamed CSS Nashville.
 USS Merrimack  |  | 21 April 1861 A steam-driven screw frigate, was burned to the waterline and sunk 20 April 1861 in preparation for the surrender of the Gosport Shipyard the next day. Floated and rebuilt as casemate ironclad CSS Virginia, she participated in the Battle of Hampton Roads but was scuttled 11 May 1862 to avoid recapture.
 CSS A. J. View |  | 28 November 1861 A collier while cruising in Mississippi Sound 28 November 1861, the Union screw steamer USS R. R. Cuyler seized A. J. View off Pascagoula, Mississippi, when the schooner attempted to slip out to sea.
 SS Arizona |  Private ship| 15 January 1862 |   | 28 October 1862A civilian side-wheel steamer, captured by Confederate forces at New Orleans. Pressed into Confederate naval service, she was recaptured by USS Montgomery off Mobile, Alabama, on 28 October 1862.
 SS Magnolia |  Private ship| 15 January 1862 |   | 19 February 1862A civilian side-wheel steamer, captured by Confederate forces at New Orleans. Pressed into service as a blockade runner, she was recaptured by USS Brooklyn and USS South Carolina off Mobile, Alabama, on 19 February 1862, then pressed into service with the US Navy blockade fleet as USS Magnolia.

 CSS Calhoun |  | 23 January 1862 A 508-ton side-wheel steamer and gunboat, built in 1851 at New York City as the civilian steamer Calhoun. Served as a Confederate privateer and used as a blockade runner in May 1861.
 CSS Eastport |  | 7 February 1862A steamer and ironclad, at Cerro Gordo, Tennessee, captured by three Union gunboats. Renamed USS Eastport, later destroyed on Red River 15 April 1864 to prevent recapture.
 CSS Ellis |  | 10 February 1862;a gunboat in the Confederate States Navy and the United States Navy during, later lost during a raid while under command of Lieutenant William B. Cushing.
 CSS Teaser |  | 10 February 1862;After capture was taken into the United States Navy and assigned to the Potomac Flotilla.
 Darlington |  | 3 March 1862A Confederate sidewheel steamer, commanded by J.W. Godfrey, captured by USS Pawnee at Cumberland Sound, Florida.
 Bermuda |  | 27 April 1862A large iron-hulled screw steamer of 1,238 tons built in 1861 at Stockton-on-Tees as a blockade runner for transporting military supplies to the Confederacy, commanded by Charles W. Westendorff. Captured by USS Mercedita, commanded by Henry S. Stellwagen.
 CSS Victoria |  | 6 June 1862A side-wheel steamer acquired by the Confederate Government for service as a troop transport on the waters of the Mississippi River. Captured by Union forces at Battle of Memphis and renamed USS Abraham.
 SS Mexico |  Private ship |  | 6 June 1862Originally the 1043-ton side-wheel river steamer, built 1851 at NY, owned by Southern Steamship Co. Pressed into service by the Confederacy at New Orleans 15 January 1862. She ran aground during the Battle of Memphis, captured, renamed USS General Bragg.
CSS General Sumter |  | 6 June 1862A side wheel steamer, Capt. W. W. Lamb. Built as Junius Beebe, in 1853 at Algiers, Louisiana. Captured during the Battle of Memphis by Union forces, renamed USS Sumter.
 Napier |  | 29 July 1862Blockade runner captured by USS Chippewa 
 Memphis |  | 31 July 1862A 7-gun screw steamer, built by William Denny and Brothers, in Scotland in 1861, serving as a blockade runner before being captured by USS Magnolia and taken into the Union Navy.
 CSS De Soto |  Private ship |  | 30 September 1862A sidewheel steamer, taken over by the Confederate forces for use on the Mississippi River. Carrying Confederate officers, she was surrendered to Union forces and taken into the Union Army as transport, then transferred to the Navy as USS De Soto and later renamed USS General Lyon.
 CSS Emily Murray |  | 9 February 1863Confederate schooner captured by USS Coeur de Lion while enforcing the blockade off Machodoc Creek, Virginia.
 CSS Robert Knowles |  | 9 February 1863Confederate schooner captured by USS Coeur de Lion while enforcing the blockade off Machodoc Creek, Virginia.
 |  |  | 14 February 1863A Paddle steamer converted into a ram for the United States Ram Fleet, she ran aground after taking heavy fire from the Fort DeRussy shore batteries, and was captured by the Confederate States Army.
 Peterhoff |  ~   | 25 February 1863A specially built blockade-running steamer, captured leaving St. Thomas by the USS Vanderbilt, commanded by Commodore Charles Wilkes.
USS Cherokee | ~  | 8 May 1863A former blockade runner she was captured by USS Canandaigua leaving Charleston, South Carolina.
 CSS Atlanta |  | 17 June 1863A 1006-ton Casemate ironclad Built in Glasgow, originally named Fingal. She ran the blockade into Savannah, Georgia, in November 1861 with a large cargo of weapons and military supplies. Later ran aground and captured by John Rodgers  in command of USS Weehawken in Wassaw Sound.
 CSS Archer |  | 25 June 1863originally a fishing schooner captured by the Confederate cruiser CSS Tacony and converted into a Confederate cruiser for commerce raiding.
 SS Britannia |  Private ship | 25 June 1863An iron-hulled, side-wheel steamer laid down and built in 1862 to run through the Union Navy's blockade. Captured by USS Santiago de Cuba.
 CSS Merrimac |  | 24 July 1863 A sidewheel steamer commanded by William P. Rogers used as a blockade runner. Captured by USS Iroquois commanded by J. S. Palmer off the coast of Cape Fear River, North Carolina.
 SS Emma |  Private ship | 24 July 1863 A Baltimore, Maryland-built vessel which was operating out of Nassau, Bahamas, under a Bahamian register, captured by USS Adirondack while trying to evade the Union blockade.
 CSS Robert E. Lee |  | 9 November 1863A schooner-rigged, iron-hulled, paddle-steamer used as a blockade runner commanded by Lieutenant Richard H. Gayle. Captured off the coast of North Carolina by USS James Adger and USS Iron Age.
 CSS Annie Thompson |  | 16 January 1864A sloop and blockade runner, run aground and captured by USS Fernandina at St. Cathrine's Sound.
 USRC Dodge |  |  | 4 April 1864 Seized by the Confederates at Galveston, Texas, at the war's outbreak and renamed Mary Sorly. Recaptured by USS Sciota trying to run the blockade.
 CSS Bombshell |  | 5 May 1864An Erie Canal steamer – was a U.S. Army transport, later sunk by the Confederate batteries on 18 April 1864, then raised and taken into the Confederate States Navy under the command of Lieutenant Albert Gallatin Hudgins, CSN.
 SS Tristram Shandy  15 May 1864An iron-hulled sidewheel steamer completed in 1864 at Greenock, used as a blockade runner, captured by the USS Kansas.
USS Water Witch |  | 3 June 1864 A wooden-hulled, sidewheel gunboat used in Gulf blockading squadron, captured by CSN gunboat fleet in Ossabaw Sound, 1st Lt. Thomas P. Pelot in command.
 CSS Selma |  | 5 August 1864Captured at Battle of Mobile Bay.
 CSS Tennessee |  | 5 August 1864An ironclad ram, commissioned 16 February 1864, Lieutenant James D. Johnston in command. Later became the flagship of Admiral Franklin Buchanan who surrendered at the Battle of Mobile Bay.
 CSS Advance |  | 10 September 1864A side-wheel steamer, built at Greenock, Scotland, in 1862, purchased by the CSA (North Carolina) under the name Lord Clyde in 1863, renamed Advance for running Union blockade. Vessel made 20 blockade runs before its capture by USS Santiago de Cuba off Wilmington, North Carolina. Renamed USS Frolic in 1865.
  |  | 27 October 1864 A steam-powered ironclad ram of the Confederate Navy (and later the second Albemarle of the United States Navy), commanded by Captain James W. Cooke, sunk by spar torpedo, captured, raised, and sold.
CSS Lady Sterling |  | 28 October 1864Confederate blockade runner CSS Lady Stirling, built by James Ash at Cubitt Town, London, in 1864. She was badly damaged and captured by the United States Navy on 28 October 1864 off Wilmington, North Carolina.
 Charter Oak |  | 5 November 1864A schooner and cargo ship out of Boston, commanded by Samuel J. Gilman, used in the American Civil War, captured by CSS Shenandoah, commanded by Captain James Iredell Waddell and burned in 1864.
 D. Godfrey |  | 8 November 1864A cargo bark from Boston, captured by CSS Shenandoah, commanded by Captain James Iredell Waddell, sunk southwest of the Cape Verde Islands. See also: Vessels captured by CSS Shenandoah
SS Syren |  | 18 February 1865The Syren  was a sidewheel steamer built at Greenwich, Kent, England in 1863 and designed for outrunning and evading the vessels on Union blockade patrol. Owned by the Charleston Importing and Exporting Company, the Syren made her first run on 5 November 1863, running supplies from Nassau to Wilmington. The Syren completed a record 33 runs through the blockade, the most of any blockade runner. Abandoned and set fire the Union Army captured her in Charleston harbor where she had successfully run in through the blockade the night before.See also: Wilmington, North Carolina in the American Civil War
 CSS Columbia |  | 18 February 1865An ironclad ram. Found by Union forces near Fort Moultrie when they took possession of Charleston in 1865.
 CSS Texas |  | 4 April 1865A twin propeller casement ironclad ram, captured at Richmond navy yard by union forces after city was evacuated.
 See also:
 Ships of the Union Navy
 Blockade runners of the American Civil War
 List of ships of the Confederate States Navy

Second Schleswig War 

During the Second Schleswig War in 1864 the Royal Danish Navy blockaded the German ports. While the Danes suffered military defeat on land during the conflict, their navy succeeded in maintaining the blockade throughout the war.

 Neptunus |  Private ship | 8 March 1864A civilian ship, captured by the Danish frigate Jylland off Helsingør.
 Eudora |  Private ship | 2 April 1864A civilian barque, captured by the Danish corvette Dagmar off Hamburg.

Chincha Islands War 

The Chincha Islands War (18641866) was a mostly naval conflict between Spain and her former South American colonies Peru, Chile, Ecuador and Bolivia.

 Virgen de Covadonga |  | 26 November 1865 The naval schooner was captured in the Battle of Papudo by the Chilean corvette Esmeralda. Pressed into Chilean service, she was sunk by a naval mine during the War of the Pacific in 1880.
 Paquete de Maule |  | 6 March 1866The sidewheel steamer was captured by Spanish frigates. She was burned and destroyed by the Spanish on 10 May 1866.
 Pampero |  | 22 August 1866The naval steamer was captured by the Spanish frigate Gerona in the action of 22 August 1866 off Madeira. She was pressed into Spanish naval service and remained so until sunk by Nationalist aircraft at Barcelona during the Spanish Civil War in 1938.

1870–1879

Ten Years' War
The Ten Years' War was fought between Cuban revolutionaries and Spain. Breaking out in 1868, the war was won by Spain by 1878.

 Virginius | | 30 October 1873The blockade runner, carrying 103 Cuban soldiers, was captured by the Spanish corvette . After initially executing 53 crew members as pirates, the Spanish authorities were pressured by the US and British governments to release the ship and the 91 surviving crew in December 1873.

War of the Pacific 

The War of the Pacific (18791883) was fought between Peru and Bolivia on one side, with Chile on the other. Chile emerged victorious.

 Rimac |  | 23 July 1879The troopship was captured by the Peruvian ironclad Huáscar and the Peruvian corvette Unión off Antofagasta. The ship was taken into service with the Peruvian Navy.
 Huáscar |  | 8 October 1879The ironclad was captured by Chilean naval forces in the Battle of Angamos. The ship was taken into service with the Chilean Navy under the same name and is still afloat as a museum and historical memorial ship at the port of Talcahuano, Chile
 Pilcomayo |  |18 November 1879 captured by Chilean Blanco Encalada.
 Alay |  | 22 December 1879captured by Chilean transporter Amazonas between Panama and El Callao.

1880–1889 

(Ship names / Information forthcoming)

1890–1899

First Sino-Japanese War
The 1894–95 First Sino-Japanese War was fought between Qing Dynasty China and Meiji Japan over dominance of Korea. The war ended in Japanese victory and great Chinese loss of territory and prestige.

 Tsao-kiang |  Beiyang Navy | 27 July 1894The gunboat was captured by the Japanese cruiser  during the Battle of Pungdo. She served in the Japanese Navy and government service under the name Sōkō until 1924. Sold to civilian interests, she sailed as a transport until scrapped in 1964.
 Fulong |  Beiyang Navy | 7 February 1895The torpedo boat was captured by Japanese forces during the Battle of Weihaiwei on 7 February 1895. She served in the Japanese Navy under the name Fukuryū until sold for scrap in 1908.
 Jiyuan |  Beiyang Navy | 17 February 1895The cruiser was captured by Japanese forces after the 17 February 1895 Battle of Weihaiwei. She served in the Japanese Navy under the name Saien until mined and sunk off Port Arthur on 30 November 1904, during the Russo-Japanese War.
 Pingyuan |  Beiyang Navy | 17 February 1895The armored cruiser was captured by Japanese forces after the 17 February 1895 Battle of Weihaiwei. She served in the Japanese Navy first under the name Ping Yuen Go and later as Heien until mined and sunk west of Port Arthur on 18 September 1904, during the Russo-Japanese War.
 Zhenyuan |  Beiyang Navy | 17 February 1895The turret ship was captured by Japanese forces after the 17 February 1895 Battle of Weihaiwei. She served in the Japanese Navy under the name Chin'en until scrapped in 1914.

Spanish–American War
The Spanish–American War lasted only ten weeks and was fought in both the Caribbean and the Pacific theaters. American naval power proved decisive, allowing U.S. expeditionary forces to disembark in Spanish controlled Cuba which was already under constant pressure from frequent insurgent attacks. It is the only American war that was prompted by the fate of a single ship, the USS Maine, then berthed in a Cuban harbor, which exploded while its crew lay asleep.

 Saranac | | 26 February 1898The bark Saranac—under Captain Bartaby—was captured in the Philippines by the Spanish gunboat Elcano carrying 1,640 short tons (1,490 t) of coal from Newcastle, New South Wales, to Iloilo, for Admiral Dewey's fleet.
 Elcano |  | 1 May 1898The gunboat was captured by US naval forces during the Battle of Manila Bay on 1 May 1898. She was officially turned over to the US Navy on 9 November 1898.
 Reina Mercedes |  | 17 July 1898The scuttled cruiser was captured by US naval forces at Santiago de Cuba. The ship was raised in 1899 and taken into service with the US Navy.

See also 
 Lists of ships
 List of ships captured in the 18th century
 List of naval battles
 List of single-ship actions
 History of the Royal Navy
 History of the United States Navy
 Bibliography of early American naval history
 Bibliography of 18th-19th century Royal Naval history

References

Notes

Bibliography 

  – Book
  Book
  Book
  Book
  Book
  Book
  Book1 Book2
  Book
  Book
  Book
  Book
  Book
 Book

 Book
 , Book
  Book
  Book
  Book
  Book
  Book
  Book
  Book
  Book
  Book1 Book2
  Book
  Book
  Book
  Book
  Book
 , E'Book
 , Book
 , Book
 
  E'book
  Book
  Book
 
  Book
  Book
  Book
 
  Book
  Book1 Book2
  E'book
  E'book
  Book
  Book
  Book
 Book
  Book
  Book
  Book1 Book2
  Book
 
  Book
  Book
  E'book

19th-century maritime incidents
Lists of captured ships
Naval warfare
Incidents
Naval history